Ralph Earl Capron (June 16, 1889 – September 19, 1980) was an American baseball and football player. He also played football in 1920 for the Chicago Tigers of the American Professional Football Association (later renamed the National Football League).

Capron was born in 1889 in Minneapolis. He played high school football, first at South High School in Minneapolis and later at West High.

In 1911, he played college football at the University of Minnesota.

In March 1912, Capron signed to play professional baseball with the Pittsburgh Pirates. He was assigned to the Milwaukee club where he garnered a comparison to Ty Cobb after batting .341 and stealing three bases in his first 10 professional games.

References

External links

1889 births
1980 deaths
Philadelphia Phillies players
Pittsburgh Pirates players
Major League Baseball outfielders
Chicago Tigers players
Oakland Oaks (baseball) players
Milwaukee Brewers (minor league) players
St. Paul Saints (AA) players
Baltimore Orioles (IL) players
Baseball players from Minnesota
Minnesota Golden Gophers football players
Minnesota Golden Gophers baseball players